Elections were held in the organized municipalities in the Sudbury District of Ontario on October 22, 2018 in conjunction with municipal elections across the province.

Baldwin

Chapleau

Source:

Espanola

Source:

French River

Source:

Killarney

Source:

Markstay-Warren

Source:

Nairn and Hyman

Sables-Spanish Rivers

Source:

St. Charles

Source:

References

Sudbury
Sudbury District